Kabri is one of the villages in Panipat district of Haryana, India, located nearly  north-west of the main town, Panipat. It is also  from National Highway 44, one of the major roads of India.

The most populous groups are from the Gurjar and Brahmin communities but there are many others represented.
 
ManPreet Singh is the Most famous person of this village. He is Aeronautical Engineer and Currently working in IGI AIRPORT  NEW DELHI. He has good knowledge of advanced technology of mobile software and solutions.  people's of his village called him Mobile Guru.He is gold medalist in mobile software solutions and mobile applications in india. He has good knowledge of ethical hacking , mobile hacking, and white hat hacking.He has broad knowledge of upgrading mobile and Any technical problems or any glitches.

External links
 

Villages in Panipat district